Charles Leslie Briggs (born 1953) is an anthropologist who works at the University of California, Berkeley, United States.  Before working at Berkeley he held a position as Chair of the Ethnic Studies Department at University of California, San Diego.

Biographical information
He was born in Albuquerque, New Mexico in 1953.  He got a BA in Anthropology, Psychology and Philosophy from Colorado College.  He received his PhD in Anthropology from the University of Chicago in 1981.

Research interests
Charles L. Briggs is the Alan Dundes Distinguished Professor in Folklore at Berkeley. He focuses on linguistic and medical anthropology, social theory, modernity, citizenship and the state, race, and violence. He has studied the tension between modernity and traditionality as socio-political processes in performance, focusing on jokes, proverbs, legends, myths, anecdotes, gossip, curing songs, and ritual wailing, along with how constructions of language and tradition have shaped the politics of modernity. His original research focus centered on the "Mexicano" population of his home state of New Mexico in the US.  From then on he has focused his attention on the Warao, an Amerindian people of Delta Amacuro state in Venezuela. Current projects focus on revolutionary health care in Venezuela; how the state is “communicated” through the press particularly through health issues in Cuba, Venezuela, and the United States; and how violence is projected in legal, media, and medical institutions (Venezuela).

Publications
Representative publications include:
1980. The Wood Carvers of Córdova, New Mexico: Social Dimensions of an Artistic "Revival."
Knoxville: University of Tennessee Press.
1986. Learning How to Ask: A Sociolinguistic Appraisal of the Role of the Interview in Social
Science Research. Cambridge: Cambridge University Press.
1988. Competence in Performance: The Creativity of Tradition in Mexicano Verbal Art.
Philadelphia: University of Pennsylvania Press.
1990. The Lost Gold Mine of Juan Mondragón: A Legend of New Mexico Performed by
Melaquías Romero. Tucson: University of Arizona Press. (By Charles L. Briggs and Julián Josué
Vigil).
1990. Poetics and Performance as Critical Perspectives on Language and Social Life. Annual
Review of Anthropology 19:59-88 (Richard Bauman and Charles L. Briggs).
1992. Genre, Intertextuality, and Social Power. Journal of Linguistic Anthropology 2(2):131-72.
(by Charles L. Briggs and Richard Bauman).
1992. 'Since I Am a Woman, I Will Chastise My Relatives': Gender, Reported Speech, and the
(Re)production of Social Relations in Warao Ritual Wailing. American Ethnologist 19:337-61.
1993. Personal Sentiments and Polyphonic Voices in Warao Women's Ritual Wailing: Music
and Poetics in a Critical and Collective Discourse. American Anthropologist 95:929-57.
1993. Theorizing Folklore: New Perspectives on the Politics of Culture. Western Folklore
52(2,3,4). (Special issue edited by Charles L. Briggs and Amy Shuman.)
1996. Disorderly Discourse: Narrative, Conflict, and Social Inequality. Oxford: Oxford
University Press. (Edited by Charles L. Briggs)
1996. The Politics of Discursive Authority in Research on the "Invention of Tradition." Cultural
Anthropology 11(4):435-69.
1998. "You're a Liar—You're Just Like a Woman!" Constructing Dominant Ideologies of
Language in Warao Men's Gossip. In Bambi Schieffelin, Kathryn A. Woolard, and Paul V.
Kroskrity, eds., Language Ideologies: Practice and Theory, 229-55. New York: Oxford
University Press.
2000. “Bad Mothers” and the Threat to Civil Society: Race, Cultural Reasoning, and the
Institutionalization of Social Inequality in a Venezuelan Infanticide Trial. Law and Social Inquiry
25(2):299-354. (by Charles L. Briggs and Clara Mantini-Briggs).
2002. Linguistic Magic Bullets in the Making of a Modernist Anthropology. American
Anthropologist 104(2): 481-98.
2003. Stories in the Time of Cholera: Racial Profiling during a Medical Nightmare. Berkeley:
University of California Press. (by Charles L. Briggs with Clara Mantini-Briggs; Spanish,
expanded edition, Nueva Sociedad, 2004).
2003. Voices of modernity: Language Ideologies and the Politics of Inequality. Cambridge:
Cambridge University Press. (by Richard Bauman and Charles L. Briggs)
2003. Why Nation-States Can’ t Teach People to be Healthy: Power and Pragmatic Miscalculation
in Public Discourses on Health. Medical Anthropology Quarterly 17(3):287-321.
2004. Malthus' Anti-rhetorical Rhetoric, or, on the Magical Conversion of the Imaginary into the
Real. In Categories and Contexts: Critical Studies in Qualitative Demography, ed. Simon Szreter,
Hania Sholkamy, and A. Dharmaligam, pp. 57–76. Oxford: Oxford University Press.
2004. Theorizing Modernity Conspiratorially: Science, Scale, and the Political Economy of Public
Discourse in Explanations of a Cholera Epidemic. American Ethnologist 31(2):163-186.
2005. Genealogies of Race and Culture and the Failure of Vernacular Cosmopolitanisms:
Rereading Franz Boas and W.E.B. Du Bois. Public Culture 17(1):75-100.
(in press). Communicability, Racial Discourse, and Disease. Annual Review of Anthropology 34.

Awards
He is the winner of the 2007 J.I. Staley Prize in Anthropology and the Rudolf Virchow Award in Medical Anthropology in 2006 as well as the Edward Sapir Prize, in collaboration with Richard Bauman, from the Society for Linguistic Anthropology, November 2006.

References

External links
Faculty home page

1953 births
Living people
American anthropologists
American anthropology writers
American male non-fiction writers
American folklorists
Anthropology educators
Anthropological linguists
Medical anthropologists
University of Chicago alumni
University of California, Berkeley College of Letters and Science faculty
University of California, San Diego faculty